Richard Smith (September 17, 1886 – 1937), also known as Dick Smith, was a screenwriter, actor, and film director. Smith was born in Cleveland, Ohio, and became a comedian active in the vaudeville era. He met his wife Alice Howell in 1910 and the two performed together as Howell and Howell. After working under direction of Mack Sennett at the American Mutoscope and Biograph Company in New York City, Smith moved to Los Angeles, California. Smith and his wife starred in reels together produced by L-KO Kompany.

While Howell was contracted at Universal Studios, Smith directed her in films described in the book Clown Princes and Court Jesters as, "some of Universal's most memorable comedies of the twenties". With colleague Vin Moore, Smith directed actor Oliver Hardy in the 1920 film Distilled Love. Smith directed the Marx Brothers in 1921 in their first film, titled Humor Risk, which has since been lost. In 1925, Smith's directing work included films starring Bert Roach, Neely Edwards, and Charles Puffy. His contributions at Universal included a series of comedy films called "The Collegians".

Career

Vaudeville
Richard Smith was active in the field of comedy, and participated in the vaudeville scene. He met his wife Alice Howell when she was a member of a production by DeWolf Hopper, in 1910. The two utilized the title of a previously known vaudeville group, and performed together as Howell and Howell. The Howell and Howell duo performed together for three years. Their performances included burlesque and vaudeville. Mack Sennett directed Smith at the American Mutoscope and Biograph Company in New York City. Sennett offered Smith a chance to go with him when he started the company Keystone Studios, but he declined the opportunity.

Film director
Due to a medical condition, Smith decided to switch his residence from New York to Los Angeles, California, where his wife began to gain roles in the film industry under Sennett in 1914. The two starred together in reels including Dad's Dollars and Dirty Doings, a comedy by L-KO Kompany. Under the production company Reelcraft Pictures, Smith wrote and directed several films which his wife starred in. In the book Clown Princes and Court Jesters, authors Kalton C. Lahue and Samuel Gill describe these films directed by Smith and starring Howell as "low-burlesque charades and as such were slanted toward the neighborhood and second-run houses, where they found receptive audiences."

After his wife became an actress in features at Universal Studios in 1921, Smith directed her in multiple comedies. Lahue and Gill characterize these films as, "some of Universal's most memorable comedies of the twenties", and note, "Starting with the usual framework provided by the situation comedy format, directors William Watson and Richard Smith inserted a sufficient amount of subdued slapstick to flavor these single reels with laugh after laugh." Comedian Oliver Hardy acted under the direction of Smith and associate Vin Moore, in the 1920 film Distilled Love; Smith also had an acting role in the film as an artist. He served as director in 1921 of Humor Risk, the first film starring the Marx Brothers. Smith directed actors including Bert Roach and Neely Edwards in the 1925 film A Nice Pickle, and Charles Puffy the same year in Muddled Up. After Howell retired from film in the 1926, Smith kept up with his contracted work at Universal and wrote a set of comedy films called "The Collegians". Smith died in 1937 in Los Angeles, California, at fifty years old.

Filmography

See also

Cinematography
Directorial debut
Filmmaking
List of directorial debuts
List of film and television directors

References

Further reading

External links
Richard Smith, at Allmovie

American film directors
American male screenwriters
English-language film directors
Silent film directors
Silent film screenwriters
1886 births
1937 deaths
20th-century American male writers
20th-century American screenwriters